Wings of Youth (Spanish: Alas de juventud) is a 1949 Spanish drama film directed by Antonio del Amo and starring Antonio Vilar, Carlos Muñoz and Fernando Fernán Gómez.

The film's sets were designed by Sigfrido Burmann.

Cast
 Antonio Vilar as Daniel  
 Carlos Muñoz as Luis  
 Fernando Fernán Gómez as Rodrigo  
 Julio Riscal as Felipe  
 Nani Fernández as Elena  
 Rina Celi as Emilia  
 Tomás Blanco as Capitán Rueda  
 Francisco Pierrá as Coronel  
 Manuel Aguilera as Lince  
 Manuel de Juan as Ventura 
 Jacinto San Emeterio as Oficial 
 José Nieto

References

Bibliography 
 de España, Rafael. Directory of Spanish and Portuguese film-makers and films. Greenwood Press, 1994.

External links 
 

1949 drama films
Spanish drama films
1949 films
1940s Spanish-language films
Films directed by Antonio del Amo
Films scored by Jesús García Leoz
Spanish black-and-white films
1940s Spanish films